__notoc__

Tadao Nagahama (長浜 忠夫 Nagahama Tadao; September 26, 1936 – January 14, 1980) was a Japanese director of both puppet shows and animation.

He is best known as the director of Sunrise and Toei Company's Robot Romance Trilogy, which added human drama to the Super Robot Genre.

Nagahama also directed several hit anime series that are still well known among Japanese viewers. Moreover, he produced hits with works of all genres, including sports, comedies, shōnen, shōjo, and Super Robots.

He and his wife contracted hepatitis while traveling overseas. Although his wife survived, he died from the disease at the age of 43.

Filmography

Puppetry
 伊賀の影丸 (Iga no Kagemaru), 1964
 ひょっこりひょうたん島 (Hyokkori Hyōtanjima), 1964–1969

Anime
 Obake no Q-tarō, 1965 (episode director)
 Perman, 1967 (episode director)
 Star of the Giants, 1968 (director)
 Chingo Muchabei, 1971 (episode director)
 Shin Obake no Q-tarō, 1971 (director)
 Gutsy Frog, 1972 (director)
 Samurai Giants, 1973 (director)
 Brave Raideen, 1975 (director, episodes 27–50)
 Combattler V, 1976 (director)
 Voltes V, 1977 (director)
 Ore wa Teppei, 1977 (episode director)
 Daimos, 1978 (director)
 Daltanious, 1979 (recording director)
 The Rose of Versailles, 1979 (director, episodes 1–18)
 Zukkoke Knight De La Mancha, 1980 (anime adaptation of Don Quixote)
 Ulysses 31, 1981 (episode director)

External links
 Tadao Nagahama
 

1936 births
1980 deaths
Anime directors
Deaths from hepatitis
Japanese art directors
Japanese lyricists
People from Kagoshima Prefecture
Sunrise (company) people
Japanese voice directors